The Prince is a 1996 Indian Malayalam-language action film scripted and directed by Suresh Krissna, starring Mohanlal and Prema. Dialogues were written by T. A. Razzaq. The film marked the accomplished Tamil director, Krishna's debut in Malayalam cinema and also Prakash Raj’s Malayalam debut as well. The music was scored by Deva.

Plot 

It was a story of the other side of a Mafia family. Jeeva, son of a Don Vishwanath, falls in love with Swarna, daughter of a famous Carnatic singer. He hides the truth of his family background from her to win her love. But she learns of this, and uses silence to make him confess his situation. How Jeeva goes through trials and tribulations of saving his love on one side and law of the mafia on the other side forms the theme of the film.

Cast 
 Mohanlal as Jeeva "Prince" Viswanath
 Prema as Swarna
 Prakash Raj as Surya Das
 Girish Karnad as Viswanath
 Nizhalgal Ravi
 Spadikam George as Rajashekharan
 Srividya
 Oduvil Unnikrishnan
 Jagannatha Varma
 Renuka

Soundtrack 
The soundtrack consists of six songs composed by Deva, with lyrics penned by Girish Puthenchery.

Malayalam (Original)

Telugu soundtrack (Dubbed)

Reception 
The film was released on 27 August 1996. Prince was released with high expectations among audience, considering the director's previous release Baashha being a major success, but it underperformed at the box office. About the unexpected failure, Krissna said: "Mohanlal is a superstar in Kerala but not for his heroics or the other attributes associated with a Tamil or Telugu superstar. Maybe it was an error of judgement on my part. Even the producer did not find anything wrong with the gimmicks. But the people didn't appreciate them. Rajni (Rajinikanth) liked the film very much. Lal's change of voice also seemed to backfire. People thought someone else had dubbed for him. After a throat surgery, his voice had undergone a change. Eventually, he had to issue a statement that it was his own voice. It was like what had happened to Amitabh Bachchan in Agneepath."

References

External links 
 

1996 films
1990s Malayalam-language films
Films directed by Suresh Krissna
Films scored by Deva (composer)